Tradeshift is a cloud based business network and platform for supply chain payments, marketplaces, and apps. Its 2018 round of funding, led by Goldman Sachs, raised US$250 million at a valuation of $1.1 billion, giving the company unicorn status.  Tradeshift is Headquartered in San Francisco, California. Tradeshift serves 300 companies and has reprocessed over $1Trillion USD through transactions.

History
Tradeshift was founded in 2010 by Christian Lanng, Mikkel Hippe Brun, and Gert Sylvest. Inspiration for Tradeshift came after they created the world's first large scale peer-to-peer infrastructure for an e-business called NemHandel. The founders also had leading roles (Governing board member, Technical Director) in the European Commission project PEPPOL inside the European Union.

In 2010, the Tradeshift platform launches in May in Copenhagen. Tradeshift won the European Startup Awards in the category of "Best Business or Enterprise Startup." In 2011, Tradeshift makes its App marketplace available.

In 2012, Tradeshift moves their headquarters from Copenhagen to San Francisco. In 2013, Tradeshift opened an R&D center in Suzhou, China. Tradeshift opens an additional office in London. And LATAM e-invoicing capabilities are added through partnership with Invoiceware.

In 2014, Tradeshift expanded with offices in Tokyo, Paris, and Munich. The EU Commission officially approved the Universal Business Language (UBL) data format – a format Tradeshift supports – as eligible for referencing in tenders from public administrations.

In 2015, Tradeshift won the Circulars "Digital Disruptor" Award at the WEF conference in Davos, Switzerland. Tradeshift also acquired product information management company Merchantry, and launched e-procurement and supplier risk management solutions. In 2016, Tradeshift acquired Hyper Travel and secured a $75 million series-D round funding. In 2017, Tradeshift acquired IBX Business Network and launches Tradeshift Ada.

In 2018, secured a $250 million series-E round funding. and launches Blockchain Payments, the latter as part of Tradeshift Pay. In December 2018 Tradeshift acquires Babelway, an online B2B integration platform. The acquisition added three new office locations to Tradeshift (Salt Lake City, Louvain-la-neuve, Belgium, Cairo Egypt). In Q3 2018, Tradeshift reported year-over-year revenue growth of 400%, new bookings growth of 284%, and gross merchandise volume (GMV) growth of 262%. New total contract value also grew by US$47 million. Additionally, it added 27 new customers including Hertz, Shiseido, ECU and multiple Fortune 500 companies.

In October 2019, Tradeshift partnered with Abreon to help businesses implement new technology and establish new procedures smoothly and effectively.

In March 2020, Tradeshift collaborated with DXC for automation of procure-to-pay processes.

Financials 
The company's valuation as of May 2018 was $1.1 billion. Tradeshift is now considered a unicorn, and according to Bloomberg, will not need any further funding.

Jan 14, 2020, Tradeshift announced that they'd raised $240M in Series F finance.

Acquisitions 
2015: Tradeshift acquires product information management company Merchantry. Merchantry is retail product information management (PIM) software for multi-vendor ecommerce retailers. Merchantry is known for managing retail product information for ecommerce retailers, including amazon.com, Marks & Spencer, and others.

2016: Tradeshift acquires Hyper Travel. Hyper Travel is a travel management service that allows customers to access travel agents via its native messaging apps, SMS, and email.

2017: Tradeshift acquires IBX Business Network.

2018: Tradeshift acquires Babelway, an online B2B integration platform.

Customers 
As of 2018, Tradeshift has over 500 global customers spanning six continents and 190 countries. A sampling of Tradeshift customers include Air France KLM, Kuehne + Nagel International AG, DHL, Fujitsu, HSBC, Siemens, Société Générale, Unilever, and Volvo.

Further reading 
 Jonathan Løw: The GuruBook: Insights from 45 Pioneering Entrepreneurs and Leaders on Business Strategy an Innovation. Chapter: Christian Lanng, Leadership from the trenches. CRC Press: Boca Raton, Florida 2018.

References



Web applications
Financial software companies
Financial services companies of Denmark
Software companies of Denmark
Danish companies established in 2010
Software companies established in 2010